Evaz County is in Fars province, Iran. The capital of the county is the city of Evaz. At the 2006 census, the region's population (as Evaz District of Larestan County) was 33,346 in 6,922 households. The following census in 2011 counted 45,752 people in 10,352 households. At the 2016 census, the district's population was 40,731 in 10,940 households. Evaz District was separated from Larestan County in 2018 to become Evaz County.

The language spoken there comes from the ancient Persian dialect called Achomi (Avazi). The majority of the people in Evaz follow the religion Islam Sunni despite being the minority in Iran who follow this belief.

Administrative divisions

The population history of Evaz County's administrative divisions (as Evaz District of Larestan County) over three consecutive censuses is shown in the following table.

References

 

Counties of Fars Province